Maidbronn is a village in Bavaria, Germany, located about  northeast of Würzburg. It is part of the municipality Rimpar.

It was the location of the former Maidbronn Abbey, the church of which is still in use by the parish.

Würzburg (district)